Ulen is a lake in the municipality of Lierne in Trøndelag county, Norway.  The  lake lies south of the village of Mebygda.  Water flows south from the lake Lenglingen into Ulen, and it then continues south into the lake Rengen (which goes into Sweden).

See also
List of lakes in Norway

References

Lierne
Lakes of Trøndelag